Joseph Marcell (born 14 August 1948) is a British actor and comedian. He is best known for his role as Geoffrey Butler, the butler on the NBC sitcom The Fresh Prince of Bel-Air from September 1990 until the show ended in May 1996.

Born in Saint Lucia, he moved to the United Kingdom, when he was 9 years old and grew up in Peckham, South London. Marcell currently lives in Banstead, Surrey.

He studied speech and dance at the Central School of Speech and Drama.

Career
Marcell grew up in Peckham, South East London. As a member of the Royal Shakespeare Company, he appeared in productions of Othello and A Midsummer Night's Dream. He has also appeared in feature films and on television in Britain. He serves on the board of the Shakespeare's Globe Theatre in London where he featured in a nationwide production of Shakespeare's Much Ado About Nothing and King Lear.

He played Gonzalo in Shakespeare’s play The Tempest at Sam Wanamaker Playhouse in May 2016. He also played Solly Two Kings in the play by August Wilson, Gem of the Ocean at the Tricycle Theatre, in London, in January 2016. Marcell began rehearsals as Titus Andronicus, in July 2017, for the La Grande Shakespeare Company, in La Grande, Oregon.

Film and television

Film

Television

Stage
King Lear, as King Lear
A Midsummer Night's Dream, as Puck
Gem of the Ocean (2016), as Solly Two Kings
Lady Windermere's Fan (2018) as Lord Lorton, Vaudeville Theatre, London
The Tempest (2016) as Gonzalo, Sam Wanamaker Playhouse, London
Peter Pan (1982) as Nibs, the RSC at the Barbican

References

External links
 
 Alex Fletcher, "What happened to Geoffrey from The Fresh Prince of Bel-Air?", TV interview, Digital Spy, 24 February 2014.
 "Caribbean Footsteps meets with Joseph Marcell". YouTube
 

1948 births
Living people
20th-century English male actors
21st-century English male actors
Alumni of the Royal Central School of Speech and Drama
Black British male actors
English male film actors
English male Shakespearean actors
English male television actors
English people of Saint Lucian descent
Male actors from London
People from Peckham
People from Southall
Royal Shakespeare Company members
Saint Lucian actors
Saint Lucian emigrants to the United Kingdom